The following is a list of all the Fremantle Football Club life members, this includes players, coaches and administration. Each individual inducted has served the Fremantle Football Club for a long duration of time. With people inducted each year, players need to reach 150 senior AFL games to be legible for the Life Member induction.

Life members

References 

Life members
Fremantle-related lists
Lists of people by organization